Andreev Nunatak (‘Andreev Nunatak’ \an-'dre-ev 'nu-na-tak\) is the rocky ridge extending 2.8 km and rising to 654 m in Punchbowl Glacier on Oscar II Coast, Graham Land in Antarctica.

The feature is named after Valentin Andreev, physician at St. Kliment Ohridski base in 2000/01 and base commander in subsequent seasons.

Location
British mapping in 1974.

Maps
 Antarctic Digital Database (ADD). Scale 1:250000 topographic map of Antarctica. Scientific Committee on Antarctic Research (SCAR). Since 1993, regularly upgraded and updated.

Notes

References
 Andreev Nunatak. SCAR Composite Antarctic Gazetteer
 Bulgarian Antarctic Gazetteer. Antarctic Place-names Commission. (details in Bulgarian, basic data in English)

External links
 Andreev Nunatak. Copernix satellite image

Nunataks of Graham Land
Oscar II Coast
Bulgaria and the Antarctic